Whitby Strand was a wapentake and liberty in the North Riding of Yorkshire, England. It was one of thirteen wapentakes across the old North Riding of Yorkshire. The division of the area into the Liberty and Wapentake of Whitby Strand occurred in the 14th century, previous to this, the settlements were in the wapentakes of Langbarugh and Pickering Lythe.

History

At the time of the Norman Conquest, the land that would form the division of Whitby Strand wapentake, belonged to Gospatric, who fled to Scotland, and the confiscated land was given to Hugh Lopas. Lopas disliked the area, so gave it to his friend, William de Percy. Ownership of the region is disputed around that time, as Young states the area belonged to Siward, and that it was divided between the Langbaurgh and Pickering Lythe wapentakes, (to the north and south respectively) as the wapentake did not exist at the time of the Domesday survey. Whitby Strand as a name for the area was not recorded until 1316, and the liberty was composed of four distinct regions: Whitby, Sneaton, The Chapelry of Fylingdales, and Hackness. The title of the liberty and wapentake derives from the Scandinavian name for Whitby – Streonshalh. Historians disagree on the etymology of Streonshalh, though all agree on the language it derives from. One version is that the name translates as Strandshall, the Tower on the Strand (possibly a reference to an early lighthouse).

Not long after the Conquest, most of the land within the boundaries of what would become Whitby Strand was managed by those who ran the religious order at Whitby Abbey, however, after the Dissolution, a great portion of the land was purchased by Sir Richard Cholmley. Prior to the Dissolution, much of the land was given over to agriculture, raising animals, and fishing, with the monks from the abbey working some of the land themselves. The wapentake and liberty were referred to as Monastic in some documents, and the poll tax returns for 1379 list the settlements of the area as being within Whitby and Byland. All of the individual areas of the wapentake were later recognised as being one administrative area, including the small enclave around Byland Abbey.

In the south of the wapentake, the boundary between Whitby Strand and Pickering Lythe was an ancient line known as Green Dike (or Greendike). This boundary proceeded southerly from near to Ravenscar, with the Green Dike encompassing Suffield in the south, and the source of the River Derwent via the Lilla Cross through Littlebeck on the western side. Then towards the north-east through Egton, and then due eastwards through East Row (called Thordisa in ancient times) and out to the sea. There was a stipulation for fishing rights, including upstream of the River Esk to Ruswarp.

Changes to the administrative area of the wapentake in the early 19th century meant that the parishes of Egton, Hinderwell and Lythe were added, with some land around Hackness given over to the Pickering Lythe Wapentake. The section between Whitby and Robin Hood's Bay was bordered by the North Sea (then known as the German Ocean). By 1871, the wapentake's population was 17,541.

Settlements
In terms of toponymy, very few Anglo-Saxon names have survived with the old boundary of Whitby Strand, most names associated with the wapentake are Scandinavian in origin. In 1862, Whitby Strand was listed as having twenty townships and two parishes.

Aislaby
Briggswath
Broxa
Cayton (a detached part of Whitby Strand in the Borough of Scarborough)
Egton
Egton Bridge
Eskdaleside
Fylingthorpe
Grosmont
Hackness
Harwood Dale
Hawsker-cum-Stainsacre (township)
Iburndale
Newholm-cum-Dunsley
Normanby
Row
Ruswarp
Robin Hood's Bay
Silpho
Sleights
Sneaton
Sneatonthorpe
Suffield
Ugglebarnby
Whitby

Notes

References

Sources

Wapentakes of the North Riding of Yorkshire
Whitby